Ernest Joseph Burrus (1907–1991) was a Jesuit and a leading historian of northwestern New Spain, particularly the Baja California peninsula and Sonora. He made notable contributions in editing many accounts of the Jesuit period in documents from European archives.

Burrus was born in El Paso, Texas, on April 20, 1907. He received his ordination as a Jesuit priest in Innsbruck, Austria, in 1938. In the following year, the Nazi regime arrested and expelled him. After teaching for 10 years, in 1950 he was transferred to work at the Jesuit Historical Institute in Rome. He died on December 11, 1991.

The documents which he published in Spanish, in English translation, or both, covered a wide geographical range, but with a particular focus on northwestern New Spain. Among the most noteworthy book-length publications are a four-column history of the Jesuits in New Spain by Francisco Javier Alegre and accounts by Jesuit missionaries including Eusebio Francisco Kino, Juan María de Salvatierra, Francisco María Piccolo, Wenceslaus Linck, Benno Ducrue, and others. Burrus also produced many articles for scholarly journals.

References

1907 births
1991 deaths
20th-century American Jesuits
20th-century American historians
20th-century American male writers
Historians of Mexico
Historians of Baja California
American male non-fiction writers